The Kuwait–Najd War erupted in the aftermath of World War I. The war occurred because Ibn Saud of Najd wanted to annex Kuwait. The sharpened conflict between Kuwait and Najd led to the death of hundreds of Kuwaitis. The war resulted in sporadic border clashes throughout 1919–1920. 
 
Following the Kuwait–Najd War, Ibn Saud imposed a trade blockade against Kuwait for 14 years from 1923 until 1937. The goal of the Saudi economic and military attacks on Kuwait was to annex as much of Kuwait's territory as possible. At the Uqair conference in 1922, the boundaries of Kuwait and Najd were set. Kuwait had no representative at the Uqair conference. After the Uqair conference, Kuwait was still subjected to a Saudi economic blockade and intermittent Saudi raiding.

Events
In 1913 Emir Abdulaziz Al-Saud of Riyadh captured the Sanjak of Hasa from the Ottomans to become the new neighbor to the Emirate of Kuwait. According to the Anglo-Ottoman Convention of 1913, Kuwait's border extended south to Manifa (about 200 km from Kuwait city), but the newly expanded Saudi state didn't recognize the Convention since the Ottoman province annexed to Najd.

In 1919 Sheikh Salim Al-Mubarak Al-Sabah intended to build a commercial city in the south of Kuwait.  This caused a diplomatic crisis with Najd, but Britain intervened, discouraging Sheikh Salim.

In 1920, an attempt by the Ikhwan to build a stronghold in southern Kuwait led to the Battle of Hamdh. The Battle of Hamdh involved 2,000 Ikhwan fighters against 100 Kuwaiti cavalrymen and 200 Kuwaiti infantrymen. The battle lasted for six days and resulted in heavy but unknown casualties on both sides resulting in the victory of the Ikhwan forces and leading to the battle of Jahra around the Kuwait Red Fort.

The Battle of Jahra happened as the result of the Battle of Hamdh. A force of three to four thousand Ikhwan, led by Faisal al-Duwaish, attacked the Red Fort at Al-Jahra, defended by fifteen hundred men. The fort was besieged and the Kuwaiti position precarious; had the fort fallen, Kuwait would likely have been incorporated into Ibn Saud's empire.

The Ikhwan attack repulsed for the while, negotiations began between Salim and al-Duwaish; the latter threatened another attack if the Kuwaiti forces did not surrender. The local merchant class convinced Salim to call in help from British troops, who showed up with airplanes and three warships, ending the attacks.

After the Battle of Jahra, Ibn Saud's warriors, the Ikhwan, demanded that Kuwait follows five rules: evict all the Shias, adopt the Ikhwan doctrine, label the Turks "heretics", abolish smoking, munkar and prostitution, and destroy the American missionary hospital.

Kuwait is known for its religious tolerance. Palgrave noted that:
"The Sunni people of Kuwait are tolerant to others and not over-rigid to themselves; Wahhabism is carefully proscribed, all the efforts of Najd have never succeeded in making one single proselyte at Kuwait."

Aftermath
The 1922 Treaty of Uqair set Kuwait's border with Saudis and also established the Saudi-Kuwaiti neutral zone, an area of about 5,180 km² adjoining Kuwait's southern border.

See also
 Kuwait Red Fort
 Unification of Saudi Arabia
 Ikhwan
 Faisal al-Duwaish

References

History of Kuwait
Conflicts in 1921
1921 in Asia
Wars involving the United Kingdom
Wars involving Kuwait
Kuwait–United Kingdom relations